Chalaki (also Romanized as Chālākī) is a village in Shirin Darreh Rural District, in the Central District of Quchan County, Razavi Khorasan Province, Iran. At the 2006 census, its population was 163, in 43 families.

References 

Populated places in Quchan County